The 1998 Tour de Suisse was the 62nd edition of the Tour de Suisse cycle race and was held from 16 June to 25 June 1998. The race started in Biel and finished in Zürich. The race was won by Stefano Garzelli of the Mercatone Uno team.

Teams
Seventeen teams of up to nine riders started the race:

 
 
 
 
 
 
 
 
 
 
 
 
 
 
 
 
 Ericsson–Villiger

Route

General classification

References

1998
Tour de Suisse